Chaubisi Rajya, Chaubise Rajya or Chaubisye Rajya (literally "24 principalities") were sovereign and intermittently allied petty kingdoms in South Asia ruled by the Khas people. One of these kingdoms, Gorkha, annexed the others, becoming the present day country of Nepal. This conquest began soon after Prithvi Narayan Shah ascended to the Gorkha throne in 1743 AD. The Chaubisi Rajya were annexed during the unification from 1744 to 1816 AD. A parallel group of 22 small kingdoms, Baaisse Rajya, existed to the west of the Gandaki Basin.

The Gorkha Kingdom was founded by Drabya Shah, youngest son of Yasho Brahma Shah, king of Kaski and Lamjung, his eldest son became the king of Kaski and Lamjung which created a fight for supremacy. Palpa was one of the biggest and most powerful kingdoms; the rulers were able to create independent kingdoms in Tanahu, Makwanpur and Vijaypur. Many rulers from Nepal wanted to consolidate the principalities. The first battle took place in Nuwakot, Nuwakot. Prithvi Narayan Shah commanded Kaji Biraj Thapa Chhetri of Gorkha to attack but he delayed his invasion. Shah sent another strength to attack with Maheshwar Panta but they were badly defeated. For preparation, the king obtained new weapons from Banaras, increased military strength, and made Kalu Pande his chief minister who helped him with planning. In 1744, Shah conquered Nuwakot, then went on to win a battle against Belkot.

Not much is known about these principalities but these kingdoms played a pivotal role in the modern history of Nepal. The unified Kingdom of Nepal continued to be ruled by the Shah dynasty, with the Rana dynasty de facto ruling the country from 1846 to February 1951 AD. In 2006, a democracy movement broke out which overthrew the monarchy system and transitioned to the Federal Democratic Republic.

List of kingdoms

References 

History of Nepal
Nepal history-related lists
Unification of Nepal
Empires and kingdoms of Nepal
18th-century disestablishments in Nepal
19th-century disestablishments in Nepal
Former kingdoms